Rev. William Thompson (1712 - 1766) was an 18th-century English poet.

Life
William Thompson was the son of Rev. Francis Thompson, vicar of Brough in Westmoreland, NW England, who died in 1735; William's date of birth is not known.  William Thompson studied at Queen's College, Oxford, which his father had also attended, and graduated with a Master of Arts in 1738, afterwards becoming a fellow of the college.

Thompson became rector of Hampton Poyle with South Weston in Oxfordshire. He published his collected poems in two volumes in 1757.

Work
He is best known for the long poem Sickness (1746), which discusses various illnesses including melancholy, fever, consumption, and variola. Other poems include Epithalamium, Nativity, and Hymn to May, as well as a panegyric to Alexander Pope.

Footnotes

External links
 William Thompson at the Eighteenth-Century Poetry Archive (ECPA)

18th-century English poets
18th-century English Anglican priests
Fellows of The Queen's College, Oxford
English male poets
18th-century English male writers